The War Within may refer to:

 The War Within (film), a 2005 film
 The War Within (Shadows Fall album), 2004
 The War Within (Wells book), a 1994 book by Tom Wells on America's internal battle over the war in Vietnam
 The War Within (Woodward book), a book by Bob Woodward on the Bush Administration
 The War Within (Matas book), a fictional book by Carol Matas regarding the issues of the America Civil War and Slavery  
 The War Within (Wrekonize album)
 Transformers: The War Within, a series of Transformers comic books